Hans Michael Weiß (born 11 March 1965) is a German football manager who  is the current head coach of the Laos national football team and Laos national under-23 football team.

Managerial career
Weiß served internships with several football clubs around the globe such as Real Madrid, Arsenal, Kaiserslautern, and River Plate, to name a few.

He has worked at the Rwanda youth team programs  and served as the technical director of the Rwandese Association Football Federation, the governing body of football in Rwanda.

In January 2011, he took charge of the Philippines national football team after being referred by the German Football Association in January 2011. Under him, the Azkals rose to their highest-ever placing in the FIFA rankings, 127 (which was later surpassed, 124 under new coach Thomas Dooley). On 15 January 2014, the Philippine Football Federation officially announced that his services had been discontinued.

In April 2014 it was announced that he was part of an 8-man shortlist to replace Eric Nshimiyimana as Rwanda manager.

In June 2014, he took the control of Romanian former champions Oțelul Galați. He was sacked only three months later after a single win in seven games.

On January 18, 2017 it was reported that Weiß was appointed by the Mongolia national football team as their head coach during a meeting of the Executive Committee of the Mongolian Football Federation on January 17. Weiß formally accepted the 1-year deal on 27 March 2017. He immediately began preparations to lead the national under-23 team in 2018 AFC U-23 Championship qualification.

After three years, he departed from the coaching position of Mongolia, where he earned respect for his supporting role on developing Mongolian football.

Personal life
Weiß completed his bachelor's degree in Sports Science and Management at the University of Mainz in 1995. He is married to a Japanese woman and has two daughters (Lisa and Matilda).

Statistics

Managerial

Honors
Philippines
AFC Challenge Cup: Third place 2012
Philippine Peace Cup: 2012, 2013

References

1965 births
Living people
People from Donnersbergkreis
Johannes Gutenberg University Mainz alumni
Expatriate football managers in Rwanda
German football managers
Philippines national football team managers
German footballers
Expatriate football managers in Japan
Expatriate football managers in China
Expatriate football managers in the Philippines
Expatriate football managers in Mongolia
Expatriate football managers in Romania
German expatriate football managers
Association football goalkeepers
Mongolia national football team managers
ASC Oțelul Galați managers
Footballers from Rhineland-Palatinate
FK Pirmasens players
Expatriate football managers in Laos
German expatriate sportspeople in Romania
German expatriate sportspeople in Laos
German expatriate sportspeople in Mongolia
German expatriate sportspeople in the Philippines
German expatriate sportspeople in China
German expatriate sportspeople in Japan
German expatriate sportspeople in Rwanda